Tuchoměřice is a municipality and village in Prague-West District in the Central Bohemian Region of the Czech Republic. It has about 1,600 inhabitants.

Notable people
František Uprka (1868–1929), sculptor; died here

References

Villages in Prague-West District